Radio Métropole is a Haitian French language private radio station based in Port-au-Prince. It is a popular station, providing news updates and other information on Haiti.

History
Radio Métropole was founded on March 8, 1970 by Herbert Widmaier. A pioneer in Haitian radio, it was the first to broadcast in FM since 1970 as well as the first station to broadcast in Stereo in 1975 and to play music on CDs in 1980.

See also
 Media of Haiti

References

External links
 Radio Métropole online 

1970 establishments in Haiti
French-language radio stations
Radio stations in Haiti